= Salamboreia =

Town of ancient Cappadocia

Coordinates: 38°07′12″N 34°02′02″E

Salamboreia or Salamboria (Ancient Greek: Σαλαμβόρεια), also called Salaberina and Salambriai, was a town of ancient Cappadocia, in the district Garsauritis, inhabited in Roman and Byzantine times.

Its site is located near Kepez Tepe, Asiatic Turkey.
